Ras Mohammad is a national park in Egypt at the southern extreme of the Sinai Peninsula, overlooking the Gulf of Suez on the west and the Gulf of Aqaba to the east.

History
When the Sinai Peninsula was returned to Egypt, Ras Muhammad was declared for protection from fishing and other human activities.  Some of the fishing methods, such as using dynamite and knives were also impacting on the coral reef and the fish populations. 
In 1983, the Egyptian Environmental Affairs Agency (EEAA) established the area as a marine reserve for the protection of marine and terrestrial wildlife. The park was also established to protect against urban sprawl from Sharm El Sheikh and other coastal development.  The name literally means "Mohammad's Head", where "head" in this instance means "headland". It is said in the area that the name arose because in side view the contour of the cliff looks like the profile of a bearded man's face, with horizontal hard strata providing the nose and bearded chin.

Geography
The park is situated in the tourist region of the Red Sea Riviera, located 12 km from the city of Sharm El Sheikh. The park spans an area of 480 km2, including 135 km2 of surface land area and 345 km2 area over water.  Marsa Bareika is a small bay inlet in Ras Mohammed, and Marsa Ghozlani is a very small inlet located across from the park visitors center.

Ras Mohammad encompasses two islands, Tiran and Sanafir.  Tiran Island is located approximately 6 km offshore from the Sinai Peninsula.  Underwater caves formed as the result of earthquakes are located in Ras Mohammad.

About 0.9 hectare of mangrove forest cover a 1.16 km shallow channel at the southernmost end of Ras Mohammad peninsula.  Near the mangrove and approximately 150 m inland, there are open cracks in the land, caused by earthquakes. One of the cracks is approximately 40 m length and 0.20−1.5 m in width.  Within the cracks, there are pools of water, some with a depth of over 14 m.

The inland area includes a diversity of desert habitats such as mountains and wadis, gravel and coastal mud plains and sand dunes.  The area also plays a role in bird migration, serving as a place of rest and nourishment.

Climate
Ras Mohammad National Park experiences a very dry climate, with only minimal rainfall during the winter.  During the summer, temperatures often exceed 40 °C (104 °F) and low temperatures around 27 °C (81 °F).  Temperatures are mild during the winter, with daytime high temperatures averaging around 23 °C (73 °F) and low temperatures 14 °C (56 °F).

Ecology
Coral reef, of the fringing and hermatypic types, exist along the coast around Ras Mohammad close to the shoreline.  More than 220 species of coral are found in the Ras Mohammad area, 125 of them soft coral.  The coral reefs are located 50 to 100 m below the sea surface, and they  have a width of 30 to 50 m in most places.  Though in some spots on the western coast, the coral reef is 8 to 9 km wide.   
Shark Reef and Yolanda Reef are popular areas of coral reef in the park for divers.  Other coral reef sites include South Bereika, Marsa Ghozlani, Old Quay, and Shark Observatory.  The wreckage of the SS Thistlegorm, located off the coast of Ras Mohammad, is a popular area for divers.

The area is home to more than 1,000 species of fish, 40 species of star fish, 25 species of sea urchins, more than a 100 species of mollusc and 150 species of crustaceans. Among others, sea turtles, such as the green turtle (Chelonia mydas) and the hawksbill turtle (Eretmochelys imbricata) appear regularly in Ras Mohammad.

On the Ras Mohammad peninsula, there are acacia trees and dum palms (Hyphaene thebaica) around the wadi mouths. Ephemeral herbs and grasses also exist in Ras Muhammad.

See also
 Ras Sedr
 Dahab
 Taba
 Nuweiba
 Sharm el-Sheikh
 List of cities and towns in Egypt

References

External links

Diving Ras Muhammad
Descriptions, pictures and videos of some Ras Muhammad dive spots
 Ministry of Environment Egyptian Environmental Affairs Agency - Natural Protectorates Description

National parks of Egypt
Red Sea Riviera
South Sinai Governorate
Protected areas established in 1983
1983 establishments in Egypt
Red Sea
Sharm El Sheikh
Underwater diving sites in Egypt
Nature conservation in Egypt